Kisláng is a village in Fejér county, Hungary.

In 1559 Láng was property of Mihály Cseszneky and Balázs Baranyai.

Sources 

 Szíj Rezső: Várpalota
 Fejér megyei történeti évkönyv
 Hofkammerarchiv Wien
 Dudar története

External links 
 Street map 

Populated places in Fejér County